Joaquín Villalón Díez (born December 11, 1955), known as The Gentleman Murderer (Spanish: El asesino señorito), is a Spanish serial killer who was sentenced to 58 years imprisonment for killing two transsexuals in Madrid in 1992, after having served a previous sentence for killing his wife in Andorra in 1981. After spending 21 years in prison, he was released in 2013 as per the Parot doctrine.

Early life and first murder 
Joaquín Villalón Díez was born on December 11, 1955, to a poor family in Mérida. Little is known about his early life, but as a young adult, he abandoned the compulsory military service and acquired a fake ID, with which he married a woman in his native Mérida and had two children. He did not remain faithful to his wife, as he secretly started dating 25-year-old Francisca 'Paquita' Gracía Coca.

The pair planned to marry in August 1981, for which they travelled to the town of Les Escaldes in nearby Andorra. On July 22, 1981, Paquita revealed to her love that she was pregnant, which caused an argument to erupt between the pair. In response, Villalón strangled her and then dismembered the body using an electric saw, before packing the remains into five plastic bags and dumping them into the Bixerrais River.

Gracía's remains were found not long after by some children playing in the mountains, and police quickly determined that Villalón was the perpetrator, as he was near the crime scene and his lover had mysteriously vanished. He was located at a hostel in Spain, and promptly arrested. For this crime, Villalón was sentenced to 17 years by a Spanish court, and repatriated to serve at one of the prisons there.

Release and new murders 
After serving nine years, Villalón was transferred to the open prison Yeserías Prison (now the Victoria Kent Social Reintegration Center) in Madrid, moving in with a new girlfriend in Arganzuela. Unbeknownst to her, Joaquín started frequenting the red-light districts in the city, often soliciting sex from transsexual sex workers. On September 27, 1992, he went to the Paseo de la Habana apartment of 37-year-old nursing home attendant and Argentine native Carmen. After the two got into an argument, Villalón sprayed her with aerosol and then dragged her to the bathroom. There, he  tied a chain to her chest and set fire to her legs, before stealing several items and leaving the premises. Firefighters were called in by neighbors who had noticed the fire, and while Castagnaro survived her initial injuries, she had to have her legs amputated, and would later succumb to them on January 23, 1993.

Two weeks later, Villalón entered the Lavapiés apartment of another transsexual, 29-year-old Joanna. After the pair got into an argument, Villalón hit her, knocking Joanna into unconsciousness, then dragged her to the bathroom, where he held her head underwater until she drowned. He then burgled through her apartment, stealing the TV, a video recorder and a savings book. Joanna's friends notified authorities about her disappearance, after she had failed to attend a prostitution party at La Castellana.

Arrest, trial and sentence 
While investigating the two deaths, police combed through the victims' bank accounts and security recordings in various banks, eventually succeeding in tracking Villalón down after he had attempted to withdraw 2 million pesetas from Martínez's bank account.

Villalón was brought to trial for the crimes of murder, robbery and fraud. He and his lawyer blamed his outbursts on Villalón's supposed other personality, the one which actually charmed and then killed the victims. Taking into account his diagnosis as an antisocial, narcissistic psychopath suffering from paranoid-schizoid fits, the Audiencia Provincial of Madrid found him guilty on all counts and sentenced to 58 years and 10 months imprisonment, in addition to having to pay 5 million pesetas to the victims' families and having to undergo psychiatric treatment. He was transported to the Segovia Unit, where he would remain for the next 21 years. On October 12, 2013, he was among the inmates who were ordered released following the landmark decision of the Parot doctrine, and has lived freely since then.

See also 
 List of serial killers by country

Bibliography

External links 
 Sentencing hearing

References 

1955 births
20th-century Spanish criminals
Living people
Male serial killers
People convicted of murder by Spain
People from Mérida, Spain
People with antisocial personality disorder
People with narcissistic personality disorder
Spanish male criminals
Spanish people convicted of murder
Spanish serial killers
Uxoricides
Violence against trans women